Raiders of the Lost Library is a 2022 Russian action-adventure film directed by Gleb Orlovt. A film about the search for the legendary library of Ivan the Terrible.
It was theatrically released on October 27, 2022, by Central Partnership.

Plot 
The construction of the Moscow metro turns into an unexpected find: an old salary is pulled out from under the rubble. Its main value is by no means in gold and precious stones, with which it is generously decorated, but in the message encrypted in its drawings and inscriptions. The artifact proves that the legendary library of Ivan the Terrible exists, and the map showing the way to it is right in front of you. However, the extraordinary find is forgotten for many years.

Dozens of years later, the salary ends up in the hands of the unlucky young man Ilya Arshinov. The guy does not even suspect what he became the owner of. That's just ignorance does not simplify his life. Powerful forces begin to hunt for Ilya Arshinov. To save himself, he has to team up with a strange stranger who knows exactly how to handle an old salary, and a philologist Arina, who is able to decipher the artifact's ciphers. Now this trinity, without looking back, embarks on a dangerous adventure in order to uncover the secret of the legendary Liberea once and for all. They will visit the most dangerous and mysterious corners of the country: from Vologda and Naryan-Mar to the Kremlin dungeons.

Cast 
 Tikhon Zhiznevsky as Ilya Arshinov
 Aleksei Serebryakov as Arkady
 Diana Pozharskaya as Arina Koreneva
 Artyom Tkachenko as Max
 Sergey Gazarov as Kuchevsky
 Andrey Trushin as Igor
 Pavel Gaiduchenko as Sapieha

Production 
The project was directed by Gleb Orlov has started filming "The Treasure of Ivan the Terrible" in Moscow, produced by the ANO "Media Universal Event", the largest film companies "Central Partnership" and the online cinema "IVI" worked on its implementation with the support of the Cinema Fund. According to the press service of the Central Partnership film company, the script for the film was written by Andrey Zolotarev.

The main role is played by Tikhon Zhiznevsky, the star of the Russian film comic strip Major Grom. The company Zhiznevsky on the set was made up of no less famous and talented actors - Aleksei Serebryakov, Diana Pozharskaya, Artyom Tkachenko, and Sergey Gazarov.

Filming 
Principal photography tapes were held from October to November 2021 in Moscow. 
Filming locations will take place at the Kirillo-Belozersky Monastery in the town of Kirillov, Vologda Oblast near the city of Vologda, the town of Naryan-Mar, Nenets Autonomous Okrug, and the metropolitan metro in Moscow, as well as in the vicinity of the Moscow Kremlin.

References

External links 
 Official website 
 

2022 films
2022 action adventure films
2020s Russian-language films
Russian action adventure films
Films shot in Moscow
Treasure hunt films